Pizhou railway station is a station on Longhai railway in Pizhou, Xuzhou, Jiangsu.

History
The station was established in 1923. Since Longhai railway crossed over the Grand Canal here, it was named as Yunhe railway station (literally Canal railway station) initially.

The station was renamed as Pixian railway station (literally Pi County railway station) in 1954. In 1992, Pi County was promoted to Pizhou City, but the station name remained unchanged until 2005.

References

Railway stations in Jiangsu
Stations on the Longhai Railway
Railway stations in China opened in 1923